The Indiana Crossroads Conference is an eight-school conference, with schools located in Hendricks, Marion, Morgan and Shelby counties, mostly consisting of smaller-to-medium public and private schools, with the latest change being Cascade joining to replace Park Tudor in 2019.

Membership

Former Members

 Played in both ICRC and WRC for 2009–10 season.

State championships
Beech Grove Hornets (2)
2003 Girls Basketball (3A)
2022 Boys Basketball (3A)

Cardinal Ritter Raiders  (4)
1977 Football (1A)
2003 Football (1A)
2008 Football (1A)
2013 Football (2A)
2016 Football (2A)
2017 Baseball

Park Tudor Panthers (19)
1999 Baseball (1A)
1991 Boys Tennis
1997 Boys Tennis
1998 Boys Tennis
1998 Girls Tennis
1999 Boys Tennis
2000 Girls Tennis
2003 Boys Tennis
2005 Girls Tennis
2006 Girls Tennis
2007 Girls Tennis
2007 Boys Tennis
2008 Girls Tennis
2010 Boys Tennis
2011 Boys Basketball (2A)
2012 Boys Basketball (2A)
2014 Boys Basketball (2A)
2015 Boys Basketball (2A)
2019 Girls Soccer (1A)
Scecina Memorial (4)
1990 Football (2A)
1991 Football (2A)
2007 Softball (2A)
2013 Softball (2A)

Monrovia Bulldogs (1)
2015 Football (2A)

Indianapolis Lutheran (5)
2004 Softball (1A)
2007 Softball (1A)
2019 Softball (1A)
2021 Football (1A)
2022 Football (1A)

Triton Central  (1)
2003 Baseball (2A)

Speedway  (2)
2002 Boys Basketball (2A)
2018 Softball (2A)

References

Resources
IHSAA
IHSAA Conferences
School Directory

Indiana high school athletic conferences
High school sports conferences and leagues in the United States
Education in Marion County, Indiana
Sports competitions in Indianapolis